Andrea Ruggeri (born 1982) is an Italian international relations scholar. He has been Professor of Political Science and International Relations at the University of Oxford since 2019, and a fellow in politics at Brasenose College, Oxford, since 2014.

Career 
Born in Savona in 1982, Ruggeri carried out his undergraduate studies at the University of Genoa, graduating with a BA in international and diplomatic sciences in 2005. In 2006, he completed an MA in international relations at the University of Essex, where he also carried out his doctoral studies supported by an Economic and Social Research Council (ESRC) studentship; his PhD was awarded in 2011 for his thesis "It depends: the spatial context of civil war".

In 2010, Ruggeri was appointed to an assistant professorship in international relations at the University of Amsterdam. He spent four years there, before he was elected a fellow in politics at Brasenose College, Oxford, in 2014; he was simultaneously appointed associate professor of quantitative methods in international relations at the University of Oxford's Department of Politics and International Relations. In 2019, Ruggeri was awarded the title of Professor of Political Science and International Relations. In 2019, Ruggeri was named as a co-investigator on an £895,000 research grant from the ESRC to explore "the consequences of United Nations peacekeeping withdrawal".

References 

Living people
International relations scholars
1982 births
People from Savona
University of Genoa alumni
Alumni of the University of Essex
Academic staff of the University of Amsterdam
Fellows of Brasenose College, Oxford
Academics of the University of Oxford